The Red Jews, a legendary Jewish nation, appear in vernacular sources in Germany during the medieval era, from the 13th to the 15th centuries. These texts portray the Red Jews as an epochal threat to Christendom, one which would invade Europe during the tribulations leading to the end of the world.

Andrew Gow studied the original German language texts and concluded that the legend of the Red Jews conflated three separate traditions: the biblical prophetic references to Gog and Magog, the Ten Lost Tribes of Israel, and an episode from the Alexander Romance (3rd century AD), in which Alexander the Great encloses a race of heathens behind a great wall in the Caucasus. These traditions had some overlap already; Gog and Magog are among the nations trapped behind the wall in the Alexander Romance, and the only ones named in the version of the story appearing in Quran Sura al-Kahf (The Cave) 18:89, while the 14th-century work The Travels of Sir John Mandeville explicitly associates the confined nations with the Ten Lost Tribes.

Many pamphlets circulated interpreting such events as the rise of  Turkish power in the context of the legendary Red Jews. Both Martin Bucer and Philipp Melanchthon (1497–1560), for example, claimed that Muslims were the Red Jews.

See also
 Anti-Turkism
 Antisemitism
 Brutakhi
 History of the Jews in Germany
 Jewish Bolshevism
 Jewish Cossacks
 Khazars
 Prester John
 The Wandering Jew

References

Anderson, Andrew Runni. Alexander's Gate, Gog and Magog, and the Inclosed Nations. Cambridge, MA: Medieval Academy of America, 1932.
Brook, Kevin Alan. The Jews of Khazaria. 2nd ed. Rowman & Littlefield Publishers, Inc, 2006.
Christian of Stavelot. Exposito in Matthaeum Evangelistam.
Gow, Andrew C. The Red Jews: Antisemitism in an Apocalyptic Age, 1200-1600. Brill, 1994.
Rabb, Theodore "Action and Conviction in Early Modern Europe: Essays in Honor of E.H. Harbison, Princeton University Press, 1969

Christian folklore
European folklore
Gog and Magog
Jewish German history
Jews and Judaism in the Ottoman Empire
Khazars
Antisemitism in Germany
Antisemitic canards
Medieval legends
Mythological peoples
Stereotypes of Jewish people